Temnopteryx is a monotypic genus of flowering plants in the family Rubiaceae. It was originally described by Joseph Dalton Hooker in 1873. It is found in Cameroon, Equatorial Guinee and Gabon. The sole species is Temnopteryx sericea.

References

External links
Temnopteryx in the World Checklist of Rubiaceae

Flora of Cameroon
Flora of Equatorial Guinea
Flora of Gabon
Plants described in 1873
Taxa named by Joseph Dalton Hooker
Sabiceeae